The tooth-nosed snout weevils, Rhynchitidae, are small beetles (1.5 to 6.5 mm) that are usually found in vegetation. They usually use buds, fruits, or seeds for oviposition. The tooth-nosed snout weevils receive this name due to the teeth on the edges of their mandibles.

Traditionally considered a subfamily of Attelabidae within the Curculionoidea (weevils and relatives), the tooth-nosed snout weevils are regarded as a separate family Rhynchitidae by some authorities.

A common member of this group is the rose curculio, Merhynchites bicolor, which feeds on roses.

A number of species from  Rhynchitidae are recorded from Britain.

The thief weevil, Pterocolus ovatus, is the only pterocoline (subfamily Pterocolinae) known from North America. It is an obligate egg predator and nidus kleptoparasite (nest thief) of some beetles in the family Attelabidae.

Genera
These genera belong to the subfamily Rhynchitinae:

 Acritorrhynchites Voss, 1941
 Aderorhinus Sharp, 1889
 Afrorhynchites Legalov, 2003
 Aspidobyctiscus Schilsky, 1903
 Auletobius Desbrochers, 1869
 Byctiscus Thomson, 1859
 Caenorhinus Thomson, 1859
 Chonostropheus Prell, 1924
 Cyaneugnamptus Legalov, 2003
 Cyllorhynchites Voss, 2013
 Deporaus Samouelle, 1819
 Eomesauletes Legalov, 2001
 Essodius Sharp, 1889
 Eugnamptus Schönherr, 1839
 Eugnamptobius Voss, 1922
 Haplorhynchites Voss, 1924
 Hemilypus Sharp, 1889
 Involvulus Schrank, 1798
 Lasiorhynchites Jekel, 1860
 Mecorhis Billberg, 1820
 Merhynchites Sharp, 1889
 Metopum
 Minurus Waterhouse, 1842
 Neocoenorhinidius Legalov, 2003
 Neocoenorrhinus Voss, 1952
 Neoeugnamptus Legalov, 2003
 Pseudauletes Voss, 1922
 Rhodocyrtus Alonso-Zarazaga & Lyal, 1999
 Rhynchites Schneider, 1791
 Schoenitemnus Legalov, 2003
 Tatianaerhynchites Legalov 2002
 Temnocerus Thunberg, 1815
 Teretriorhynchites Voss, 1938
 † Stenorhynchites Havlicek 1990

References

 Triplehorn CA, Johnson NF. 2005. Borror and Delong's Introduction to the Study of Insects. 7th Edition. 
 Hall DW, Buss LJ. (2007). Thief weevil, Pterocolus ovatus Fabricius. Featured Creatures. EENY-420.

External links

Pterocolus ovatus, thief weevil on the UF / IFAS Featured Creatures Web site

Attelabidae
Articles containing video clips